The Sexuality Information and Education Council of the United States, or simply SIECUS, is a national, nonprofit organization based in Washington, D.C., dedicated to advancing sex education through advocacy, policy, and coalition building. SIECUS develops, collects, and disseminates information, promotes comprehensive education about sexuality, and advocates the right of individuals to make responsible sexual choices. It is widely regarded as the institutional voice of these concerns and a pioneer of the comprehensive sex education program.

History

The organization was founded in 1964 by Dr. Mary Calderone, then medical director at Planned Parenthood. With the conviction that sex education was sorely lacking in American society and simply "handing out contraceptives was not enough," Dr. Calderone quit her position at Planned Parenthood and established the Sex Information and Education Council of the United States (later renamed as "Sexuality Information and Education Council of the United States"), the first and only single-issue, national advocacy group dedicated to promoting sex education. Driven by Dr. Calderone's dynamic talks across the nation and its mission statement, "to establish man's sexuality as a health entity," the organization became an essential umbrella group for school administrators, sex educators, physicians, social activists, and parents seeking to access information about teaching sexuality education.

During her tenure at SIECUS, Dr. Calderone lectured extensively across the United States, addressing high school and college students, parents, educators, religious leaders, and professional groups on sex education. Known as the "mother of sex education" as well as the "grande dame of sex education", Dr. Calderone was an instrumental figure in the advancement of sex education in the United States, and credited with transforming sex education from "a series of vague moral lessons focused on disease and reproduction" to a scientifically informed, comprehensive framework.

Her popularity eventually made her a target for right-wing politicians, and conservative religious groups like the Christian Crusade, the John Birch Society, and the Moral Majority, who spent an estimated $40 million on a vicious smear campaign to discredit her. In 1968, Billy James Hargis and Gordon V. Drake targeted SIECUS, and in particular, Dr. Calderone, in the famous Is the School House the Proper Place to Teach Raw Sex? pamphlet, as well as other similar publications, claiming that the organization sought to undermine Christian morality, promote promiscuity, and corrupt children. The pamphlet also argued that sex education is part of a "giant Communist conspiracy." After years of vitriolic attacks and death threats from extremist groups, Dr. Calderone retired from SIECUS in 1982, at the age of 78.

Recent work

Comprehensive sex education
As an early advocate of scientifically-informed sex education, SIECUS is a pioneer in comprehensive sex education. According to the Sexuality Information and Education Council of the United States (SIECUS), the guidelines for comprehensive sex education are as follows:

 appropriate to the age, developmental level, and cultural background of students;
 respects the diversity of values and beliefs represented in the community;
 complements and augments the sexuality education children receive from their families, religious and community groups, and healthcare professionals;
 teaches not only about abstinence, but also contraception, including emergency contraception and reproductive choice;
 teaches about lesbian, gay, bisexual, transgender (LGBT) issues and questions issues;
 teaches anatomy, development, puberty, and relationships;
 teaches all of the other issues one would expect to be covered in a traditional sexuality education class; and
 should be science-based and medically accurate

SIECUS State Profiles
SIECUS also disseminates the SIECUS State Profiles, which provide an in-depth and up-to-date look at the state of sex education in all 50 states, the District of Columbia, Puerto Rico, and the other U.S. territories. Each profile includes an overview of each state’s current sex education laws, policies, and guidelines, newly introduced legislation, and relevant action that advocates have taken to advance or defend sex education in their communities.

The Future of Sex Education
In collaboration with two other organizations, Advocates for Youth and Answer, a national organization based at Rutgers University, SIECUS funds and manages the Future of Sex Education (FoSE) project, which seeks to create a national dialogue about the future of sex education and to promote the institutionalization of comprehensive sexuality education in public schools. The FoSE's National Sexuality Education Standards and National Teacher Preparation Standards influence policy-makers and educators alike.

Other
SIECUS is currently a member of the National Coalition Against Censorship.

See also

References

External links
Official website
Future of Sex Education Project of SIECUS, and others, includes evidence-based sex education standards.

Political advocacy groups in the United States
Sex education in the United States
Sex education advocates